Anguish (from the Latin angustia "distress") is "extreme unhappiness caused by physical or mental suffering." The feeling of anguish is typically preceded by a tragedy or event that has a profound meaning to the being in question. Anguish can be felt physically or mentally (often referred to as emotional distress).

Anguish is also a term used in philosophy, often as a synonym for angst. It is a paramount feature of existentialist philosophy, in which anguish is often understood as the experience of an utterly free being in a world with zero absolutes (existential despair). In the theology of Søren Kierkegaard, it refers to a being with total free will who is in a constant state of spiritual fear in the face of their unlimited freedom.

Mental health 

Anguish is made up of fear, distress, anxiety and panic. These stressors cause an enormous amount of dissonance, which could then lead to issues of mental health. While taken literally anguish may be defined as a physical event, but it may be extrapolated to an event of one’s psyche. It has been found that the anguish of a significant change in the way a young student lives (i.e. their new responsibilities, being on their own, multiple deadlines etc.) has contributed to significantly increased rates of college students with anxiety and depression.

Philosophy 
Kierkegaard views anguish as the same as suffering. Everyone wants to find the "truth" but it takes anguish and suffering to "appropriate" the truth. Kierkegaard put it this way in 1847 and 1850. 

Friedrich Nietzsche saw a new form of anguish emerging from secularisation’s erosion of any moral absolute, producing thereby what he ironically called “The advantages of our times: nothing is true, everything is permitted”.
Jean-Paul Sartre saw anguish as the product of man’s existential freedom, liable to manifest itself whenever a decision has to be made: thus when walking along a cliff, you might feel anguish to know that you have the freedom to throw yourself down to your imminent death. Sartre also saw the routines of everyday life as serving as “banisters” against existential despair: “guardrails against anguish”: alarm clocks...signposts, tax forms, policemen’.

Anguish and the trolley problem
A study done at the University of Princeton’s Center for the Study of Brain, Mind, and Behavior suggests that the presence of the emotion influences the decisions made. The study uses a functional magnetic resonance imaging machine to measure the brain waves of a subject when put into a difficult position. In this particular session, the subject was presented with a situation where she had to decide the fate of five people versus one person by the flip of a switch, and then decide the fate of five people versus one person by the physical acting of condemning a man to his death. The results of the fMRI stated that the decision of death by switch was easier than the decision of physically pushing a man to his death. It is theorized that the participant is being subjected to the emotion of anguish when faced with future possibility of physical condemning another person and therefore the brain enforces an “emotional block” to encourage the cessation of this behavior.

Music
Music has a particular way of eliciting emotions into its listeners. Hearing a song, symphony, or sonnet filled with anguish, one might begin to reflect upon their own life and experiences that coincide with the notes, thereby bringing repressed memories beyond subconscious to our salient mind.

See also
Dark romanticism
Guernica
Limit-experience
Marsyas
The Scream

References

External links
 
 

Existentialist concepts
Emotions